This is a list of fellows of the Royal Society elected in 1976.

Fellows
Sir Ludwig Guttmann  (1899–1980)
William Watt  (1912–1985)
Peter Frederick Baker  (1939–1987)
Thomas Gerald Pickavance  (1915–1991)
Sir Karl Raimund Popper  (1902–1994)
Roger Wolcott Sperry  (1913–1994)
Henry Charnock  (1920–1997)
Edward George Gray  (1924–1999)
Elsie May Widdowson  (1906–2000)
Sir William MacGregor Henderson  (1913–2000)
Albrecht Frohlich  (1916–2001)
John Derek Smith  (1924–2003)
John Michael Hammersley  (1920–2004)
George Bellamy Mackaness  (1922–2007)
Roger John Blin-Stoyle  (1924–2007)
Seymour Benzer  (d. 2007)
Frank William Ernest Gibson  (d. 2008)
Leonard George Goodwin  (d. 2008)
Joseph Murdoch Ritchie  (d. 2008)
Hubert Rees  (d. 2009)
Sir James Whyte Black  (d. 2010)
Daniel Joseph Bradley  (d. 2010)
Patricia Hannah Clarke  (d. 2010)
Howard Harry Rosenbrock  (d. 2010)
Sir Frederick Edward Warner  (d. 2010)
Francis Gordon Albert Stone  (1925–2011)
Sydney Percy Smith Andrew  (1926–2011)
Robin Holliday  (1931–2014)
Sir Geoffrey Allen
Peter Martin Biggs
Sir John Ivan George Cadogan
William Gilbert Chaloner
Geoffrey Eglinton  (1927-2016)
Sir Roger James Elliott
Lloyd Thomas Evans
Sir John Harold Horlock
Dan Peter McKenzie
Walter Heinrich Munk (1917–2019)
John Frederick Nye
Stephen Joseph Robinson
Stanley Desmond Smith
Brian Arthur Thrush
Charles Hard Townes
Michael John Whelan
Ronald Karslake Starr Wood

References

1976
1976 in science
1976 in the United Kingdom